KVMM-CD, virtual channel 41 (UHF digital channel 28), is a low-powered, Class A Estrella TV-affiliate television station licensed to Santa Barbara, California, United States. The station is owned by HC2 Holdings.

History

On July 23, 1992, the station signed on as K19DE and later moved to its present channel with the callsign K41EP on May 25, 1999. On May 9, 2000, it changed to KVMM-LP, and then KVMM-CA on May 20, 2003, as it was granted Class A status. The station changed its callsign to KVMM-CD and was granted Class A digital television station authorization on UHF channel 41  by the Federal Communications Commission (FCC) on December 14, 2009. The station moved to channel 28 effective May 24, 2018.

On September 25, 2006, KVMM switched to the new MTV Tres network (now simply known as Tres since July 2010), which was created as a result of Viacom's acquisition of Mas Musica. Before it was sold in the summer of 2019 to HC2, it was the final free-to-air asset owned by the 2005-2019 era Viacom entirely (and the only terrestrial Tres station). The remainder of the Más Música stations have been sold off to other parties, along with other transactions involving MTV2 free-to-air stations. Upon taking control of ownership of the station, HC2 made it an owned-and-operated station of its Azteca América network.

Digital channels
The station's digital signal is multiplexed:

References

External links

VMM-CD
Innovate Corp.
Low-power television stations in the United States
Television channels and stations established in 1999
1999 establishments in California
Former Viacom subsidiaries